Euskal Herria Bai (EH Bai) is a Basque political coalition in France, founded in 2007 by Abertzaleen Batasuna, Eusko Alkartasuna and Batasuna. Batasuna disappeared in 2013, being replaced by Sortu.

Election results

Cantonal elections of 2015
EH Bai won 17,779 votes (16.09%) in the first round of the elections, getting to the second round in 5 of the 12 cantons of the French Basque Country. In the second round EH Bai won the 78.05% of the vote in the Canton of Nive-Adour, losing in the other 4 cantons (45,40% in Canton of Saint-Jean-de-Luz, 44,43% in the Canton of Ustaritz-Vallées de Nive et Nivelle, 42,87% in Montagne Basque and 38,14% in Pays de Bidache, Amikuze et Ostibarre).

See also

Basque nationalism
Iparralde
List of political parties in France

External links
Official website
Official Twitter

References

2007 establishments in France
Basque nationalism
Left-wing nationalist parties
Left-wing political party alliances
Nationalist parties in France
Political parties established in 2007
Political parties in Northern Basque Country
Political party alliances in France
Secessionist organizations in Europe
Separatism in France
Socialist parties in France